Blackwall Ice Stream is a slightly S-shaped Antarctic ice stream about  long and  wide. It was named after Hugh Blackwall Evans (1874–1975), an English-born Canadian naturalist with the British Antarctic Expedition, 1898–1900, led by Carsten E. Borchgrevink.

References 

Ice streams of Antarctica
Bodies of ice of Coats Land